Liga Futebol Amadora Segunda Divisão (often referred to as the LFA Segunda Divisão) is second-highest division of the Liga Futebol Amadora and second-highest overall in the Timorense football league system.

Overview

Promotion from Segunda Divisão
Two finalists of the league get a promotion to Primeira Divisão.

Clubs participating in the 2018 season

The following 12 clubs competed in the 2017 Segunda Divisão with FC Zebra and FC Porto Taibesse as relegation clubs from Primeira Divisao and Lalenok United FC, FC Lero and FC Fitun Estudante as newly expand club replaced Sport Dili e Benfica, YMCA FC, União de Timor and FC Café who was relegated from 2017 season.

Blue – New expand club on Liga Futebal Amadora
Red – Relegated from Primeira Divisao

Championship History

References

External links
Official website
Official Facebook page

 
2
East Timor
Sports leagues established in 2015
2015 establishments in East Timor